Helmut Bradl (born 17 November 1961) is a  German former professional Grand Prix motorcycle road racer. He raced exclusively in the 250 class. His best year was in 1991 when he won 5 races on a Honda and ended the season ranked second after a tight points battle with Luca Cadalora. His son Stefan Bradl, won the 2011 Moto2 World Championship.

Motorcycle Grand Prix Results
Points system from 1969 to 1987:

Points system from 1988 to 1992:

Points system from 1993 onwards:

(key) (Races in bold indicate pole position; races in italics indicate fastest lap)

References

1961 births
Living people
German motorcycle racers
250cc World Championship riders